State Route 63 (SR 63) is a  state highway in the central part of the U.S. state of Alabama. The southern terminus of the highway is at an intersection with SR 14 at Claud, an unincorporated community in Elmore County. The northern terminus of the highway is at an intersection with SR 9 south of Millerville, an unincorporated community in southeastern Clay County.

Route description
SR 63 is a two-lane highway for its entire length. As the highway travels through rural Elmore County, it travels to the northeast until it approaches Eclectic, where it takes a brief turn to the west before turning northward. The highway crosses over Lake Martin as it travels from Elmore County into Tallapoosa County, passing the entrance to Wind Creek State Park along the lake.

At Alexander City, SR 63 intersects U.S. Route 280 (US 280), a major highway heading southeast from Birmingham. SR 63 continues northward through Alexander City into rural Tallapoosa County, then enters the southern tip of Clay County before reaching its northern terminus.

Major intersections

See also

References

063
Transportation in Elmore County, Alabama
Transportation in Tallapoosa County, Alabama
Transportation in Clay County, Alabama
Alexander City micropolitan area